This is a list of Regions of Peru by GDP and GDP per capita.

List of regions by GDP 
Regions by GDP in 2015 according to data by the OECD.

List of regions by GDP per capita
Regions by GDP per capita in 2014 according to data by the OECD.

References 

Regions by GDP
Gross state product
Peru